AmerIIcana or alternatively Americana II is a 2009 album by Canadian singer Roch Voisine. It was a follow-up of his successful Americana album in 2008. Many of the tracks were recorded in Nashville, Tennessee.

Track listing
Bonus bilingual English / French version tracks marked with [*]
"That's How I Got to Memphis"
"Don't Think Twice, It's All Right"  
"Take It Easy"
"If I Were a Carpenter"
"I'm Sorry" 
"Take Me Home, Country Roads"
"Song Sung Blue"
"Sundown"
"Johnny B. Goode"
"Pretty Woman"
"Heart of Gold"
"Bon Vivant"
"That's How I Got to Memphis" / Sur la route de Memphis [*]
"If I Were a Carpenter" / Si j'étais un charpentier [*]
"Song Sung Blue" / Chanson bleue [*]
"Sundown" / L'amour c'est comme l'été [*]
"Bon Vivant" [*]

Charts

Weekly charts

Year-end charts

Certifications

See also
Americana (Roch Voisine album)
Americana III

References

External links
Roch Voisine Official site album page

2009 albums
Roch Voisine albums
Covers albums